Dijon mustard is a traditional mustard of France, named after the town of Dijon in Burgundy, France, which was the center of mustard making in the late Middle Ages and was granted exclusive rights in France in the 17th century. First used in 1336 for the table of King Philip VI, it assumed its current form in 1856 when Jean Naigeon of Dijon replaced the vinegar usually used in prepared mustard with verjuice, the acidic juice of unripe grapes.

The main ingredients of the modern condiment are brown mustard seeds (Brassica juncea) and a mixture of white wine, vinegar, water, and salt designed to imitate the original verjuice. It can be used as an accompaniment to all meats in its usual form as a paste, or it can be mixed with other ingredients to make a sauce.

Commercial production
In 2008, the Anglo-Dutch group Unilever, which had several mustard plants in Europe, closed the Amora manufacturing plant. Since July 15 2009, Dijon mustard is no longer manufactured and packaged in the town of Dijon, but in the neighbouring town of Chevigny-Saint-Sauveur, and 80% of mustard seeds used in the manufacture of contemporary Dijon mustard come from Canada. The Grey Poupon mustard brand available in the United States originated in Dijon in 1866.

2022 shortage in France
Due to smaller than usual Canadian crop of mustard seeds in 2021, a shortage of dijon mustard began in France in 2022. The shortfall in Canadian production was caused by a heatwave, attributable to climate change. The shortage has been exacerbated by stockpiling by consumers.

Geographical indications
Dijon mustard does not have a protected geographical indication (PGI). 80% of seeds used to make the mustard come from Canada. A 1937 decree ruled that "Dijon mustard" can be used as generic designation and has no link to a specific terroir. However, "moutarde de Bourgogne" has a PGI and its seeds have to be produced in Bourgogne.

See also

 List of condiments
 List of mustard brands

References

External links

Techniques actuelles de fabrication de la moutarde  – "Contemporary method for the manufacture of the mustard"
Senfherstellung

Mustard (condiment)
Dijon
French cuisine